The 2008 Waveney District Council election took place on 1 May 2008 to elect members of Waveney District Council in England. This was on the same day as other local elections.

Summary

Ward results

References

2008 English local elections
May 2008 events in the United Kingdom
2008
2000s in Suffolk